Wallam Kynshi (born 23 May 1989) is an Indian cricketer. He made his List A debut on 14 October 2019, for Meghalaya in the 2019–20 Vijay Hazare Trophy. He made his first-class debut on 9 December 2019, for Meghalaya in the 2019–20 Ranji Trophy.

References

External links
 

1989 births
Living people
Indian cricketers
Meghalaya cricketers
Place of birth missing (living people)